Angélica Guadalupe Celaya (born July 9, 1982) is an American actress and model. She's best known for her role in television dramas. She is also known for playing “Jenni Rivera” in the show ‘Mariposa del Barrio.’

Early life and career
Celaya was born on July 9, 1982, in Tucson, Arizona, to Mexican parents. She attended Pueblo High School. Her acting debut was in the 2003 telenovela Ladrón de corazones. She also played roles in telenovelas including Los plateados, Marina, Mientras haya vida and Vivir sin ti.

Celaya was selected as the female lead "Zed" in the supernatural drama Constantine alongside Matt Ryan. The character of Zed was added to the show after the show-runners decided not to use the female lead from the pilot. Although the show was cancelled after only one season, Celaya's portrayal of the young psychic plagued by visions was generally well received by fans.

Since the cancellation of Constantine, Celaya has gone on to have guest appearances on multiple shows, including Castle and Criminal Minds: Beyond Borders, as well as a central role in the 2018 film Danger One.

Personal life
In 2010, while shooting the telenovela Alguien te mira, she met Rafael Amaya, with whom she started a relationship. They were engaged, but as of May 2015, Amaya confirmed their breakup. She has a son, Angel Alessandro (b. September 8, 2017) with Mexican boxer Luis García whom she married on September 8, 2018.

Filmography

Films

Television

Awards and nominations

References

External links
 
 

1982 births
Living people
American telenovela actresses
American television actresses
American film actresses
Female models from Arizona
Actresses from Tucson, Arizona
20th-century American actresses
21st-century American actresses
American actresses of Mexican descent
Hispanic and Latino American actresses